Deh Now-ye Barez (also Romanized as Deh Now-ye Bārez) is a village in Barez Rural District of Manj District, Lordegan County, Chaharmahal and Bakhtiari province, Iran. At the 2006 census, its population was 931 in 176 households. The following census in 2011 counted 1,146 people in 227 households. The latest census in 2016 showed a population of 1,171 people in 271 households; it was the largest village in its rural district.

References 

Lordegan County

Populated places in Chaharmahal and Bakhtiari Province

Populated places in Lordegan County